DAAR may refer to:
Dulles Airport Access Road, Virginia, United States 
Disney's Art of Animation Resort, Florida, United States